Room Service is a 1982 short film directed by Boris Bergman. It tells of a hotel, which looks like the sewers of Paris and it takes 28 minutes.

References 
The information in this article is based on that in its French equivalent.

1982 films
French short films
1980s French films